Carthage Conspiracy: The Trial of the Accused Assassins of Joseph Smith is a 1975 book by Brigham Young University professors Dallin H. Oaks and Marvin S. Hill on the trial of the five defendants who were charged with and acquitted of the murder of Joseph Smith. The book received the Mormon History Association Best Book prize in 1976.Bergera, Gary James; Priddis, Ronald (1985). Brigham Young University: A House of Faith. Salt Lake City, Utah: Signature Books. . It was published by the University of Illinois Press.

See also
Thomas C. Sharp
Mark Aldrich
William N. Grover
Jacob C. Davis
Levi Williams

Notes

Books about Joseph Smith
1975 non-fiction books
LDS non-fiction
Non-fiction books about murders in the United States
Books about trials
University of Illinois Press books